Reno Peter Bertoia (January 8, 1935 – April 15, 2011) was an Italian Canadian professional baseball player.

Career
Born Pierino,  Bertoia moved with his family to Canada from Italy at the age of two and a half and grew up in Windsor, Ontario. His next-door neighbour and role model was Hank Biasatti. Bertoia attended and graduated from Assumption College High School in Windsor. Signed by the Detroit Tigers in 1953, Bertoia continued his education by attending Assumption University from which he graduated in June 1958 while a member of the Tigers.  Bertoia also became close friends with Hall of Fame outfielder Al Kaline while with Detroit, and was an important part of Kaline's early years with the Tigers.

In 10 major league seasons he played in 612 games and had 1,745 at bats, 204 runs, 425 hits, 60 doubles, 10 triples, 27 home runs, 171 runs batted in (RBIs), 16 stolen bases, 142 walks, .244 batting average, .303 on-base percentage, .336 slugging percentage, 586 total bases and 31 sacrifice hits.

On May 7, 1958, Bertoia hit a grand slam against the Washington Senators at Griffith Stadium, making him the first Italian-born MLB player to do so. 

In January 1964, Bertoia signed to play in the Japanese Central League with the Hanshin Tigers. He asked for his release a few months into the season because his wife was pregnant and had been ill during most of the family's stay in Japan.

After his retirement as a player, Bertoia received his full high school teaching credentials and returned to Windsor, where he worked as a teacher for 30 years with the Windsor Catholic School Board. He was inducted into the Windsor/Essex County Sports Hall of Fame in 1982, the Canadian Baseball Hall of Fame in 1988 and the University of Windsor Alumni Sports Hall of Fame in 1988.

Bertoia died on April 15, 2011, of lymphoma in Windsor.

References

External links

SABR bio
Prince George Newspapers

1935 births
2011 deaths
Baseball infielders
Baseball people from Ontario
Canadian Baseball Hall of Fame inductees
Canadian expatriate baseball players in Japan
Canadian expatriate baseball players in the United States
Charleston Senators players
Deaths from cancer in Ontario
Deaths from lymphoma
Denver Bears players
Detroit Tigers players
Detroit Tigers scouts
Hanshin Tigers players
Italian emigrants to Canada
Kansas City Athletics players
Major League Baseball players from Italy
Major League Baseball second basemen
Major League Baseball third basemen
Minnesota Twins players
Naturalized citizens of Canada
Sportspeople from Windsor, Ontario
Syracuse Chiefs players
Toronto Blue Jays scouts
Washington Senators (1901–1960) players